This article describes the qualification process for the 2026 European Men's Handball Championship.

Format
Prior to the qualifiers, three teams were automatically qualified:
Denmark, Norway and Sweden as a host

In phase 1, four teams played a round-robin tournament, with the winner advancing to the promotion round, with up to four of the lowest-ranked fourth-ranked teams of the 2024 qualification. After that. the qualifiers will be played.

Qualification Phase 1
Since only four teams participate in this round, no draw was needed, other than the hosting rights. Although Cyprus had the hosting rights, it declined and the rights moved to Azerbaijan.

Standings

Results
All times are local (UTC+4).

Qualification Phase 2
Eight teams will participate in this round.

Teams

References

Qualification
European Men's Championship qualification
European Men's Championship qualification
European Men's Championship qualification
Qualification for handball competitions